Kallayi is one of the rivers in Kerala, India. It is linked to the Chaliyar by a man-made canal on the south side of the small timber village of Kallayi lying on its banks. The Kallayi was known for its timber businesses, but now many of these have been closed down.

Its basin is located in the Kozhikode district.

Reference notes

Rivers of the Western Ghats
Rivers of Kozhikode district